The following is a list of regattas that involve IACC yachts. International America's Cup Class (IACC) yachts were designed for the America's Cup, with specifications released in 1989 after the debacle of the 1988 America's Cup. Since then they have been used for every America's Cup from 1989 until 2010 when the class was replaced, as well as a series of other events, such as the IACC Worlds and the Louis Vuitton regattas. The IACC class was not used during the 2010 America's Cup due to a disagreement between defender Alinghi and the challenger of record BMW Oracle. A deed of gift match was instead setup that favored newly designed multihulls, which was won by the trimaran design of BMW Oracle. Equalized IACC class yachts were being match raced through the Louis Vuitton Trophy through 2010. The IACC class was replaced at the 34th America's Cup in 2013, by the catamarans of the AC72 class, and in the America's Cup World Series (which replaced the Louis Vuitton Series) with AC45 class.

Currently 100 sail numbers have been issued to IACC yachts.


List

See also
List of IACC yachts

References

International America's Cup Class